Krishnasaamy Bhagyaraj (born 7 January 1953) is an Indian director, actor, screenwriter, music director, producer and politician active mainly in Tamil films. He has also written and directed Hindi and Telugu films and TV serials. As an actor, he has worked in more than 75 films and has directed more than 25 films.  He won a Filmfare Best Actor Award for Mundhanai Mudichu (1983). He received Lifetime Achievement Award in SIIMA (2014). He is the editor of weekly magazine Bhagya and has also written several novels.

Personal life 
Bhagyaraj was born in Vellankoil near Gobichettipalayam in Erode district in Tamil Nadu. His parents were Krishnaswamy and Amaravathiamma. He married twice. His first marriage was with actress Praveena, in 1981. She died due to an aggravated case of jaundice in August 1983. His second marriage was with actress Poornima Jayaram, who was his co-star in Darling, Darling, Darling (1982), on 7 February 1984. The couple has a daughter Saranya Bhagyaraj (who starred in Parijatham (2006) and Photographer (2006)) and a son Shanthnu Bhagyaraj.

Film career

Early years (1977–1979) 
Beginning his career as an assistant to directors G. Ramakrishnan and Bharathiraja, Bhagyaraj became recognised for his scriptwriting talent. He first appeared as a junior artist playing small supporting roles with screen-space of not more than three minutes in films such as 16 Vayathinile (1977) and later appeared similarly in Sigappu Rojakkal (1978). He was assistant director to Bharathiraja in two films – 16 Vayathnile and Kizhakke Pogum Rail. Among his early work was writing the script for Bharathiraja's films Kizhake Pogum Rail (1978) and Tik Tik Tik (1981), and writing dialogues for Sigappu Rojakkal. He made his directorial début with Suvarilladha Chiththirangal in 1979 and also his debut as the leading man in Puthiya Vaarpugal, directed by Bharathiraja. He received the Tamil Nadu State Film Award for Best Dialogue Writer in Puthiya Vaarpugal (1979). He wrote dialogues and screenplay and acted in Kanni Paruvathile (1979).

Rise to stardom (1980–1999) 

He quickly established his own concern and started producing a string of distinctive films made mainly in the Tamil language. Bhagyaraj often cast himself in the lead roles of the films he scripted and directed, effectively carving out a niche for himself in the actor-auteur vein. His style of filmmaking is notable for its relatively elaborate, witty, and double entendre-laced script and socially-themed framework. His on-screen personae are typically characterised by their ironic sense of humour and intelligent bravado.

He introduced actress Urvashi in the Tamil film Mundhanai Mudichu (1983) and Kalpana (sister of Urvashi) made her debut with the 1985 film Chinna Veedu, directed by Bhagyaraj, a commercially successful film. He received the Filmfare Award for Best Actor – Tamil in Mundhanai Mudichu. He became nationally famous when he wrote the script for Mundhanai Mudichu remade in Hindi as Masterji with Rajesh Khanna in the lead role, which was huge success at the box office.

He rarely acted in films not directed or written by him, with exceptions being Anbulla Rajinikanth (1984) and Naan Sigappu Manithan (1985). He decided to direct the Hindi remake of Bharatiraja's 1984 directorial venture Oru Kaidhiyin Diary with Rajesh Khanna in the lead in 1985, but later Khanna due to his date issues had to opt out and Bhagyaraj cast Amitabh Bachchan in the Hindi remake Aakhree Raasta (1986).  Bhagayraj decided to remake the classic old Kannada film Mallammana Pavada, starring Rajkumar and B Saroja Devi into a new Tamil film Enga Chinna Rasa in 1987, which became a huge blockbuster. In 1988, he wrote the script for Idhu Namma Aalu and decided to produce it, but chose not to direct it by himself, as he wanted to act-write-direct a film on a serious issue, which was Aararo Aaariraro. He received the Best Film Award for Idhu Namma Aalu in 1990, directed by Balakumar, whereas the other film Aararo Aaariraro also was both critically acclaimed and successful at box office.

From 1991, he gradually started accepting more acting offers as a lead hero, where director-producer-scriptwriter would be three different people, rather than he himself writing-directing-acting in his films. Rudhra, Amma Vanthachu, Gnanapazham and Suyamvaram were such successful films where he was involved only in the capacity of actor. He also started the weekly magazine "Bhagya" and he is the editor of that magazine. His successful directorial ventures written by him from 1991 on were Pavunnu Pavunuthan, Sundara Kandam, Raasukutti and Veetla Visheshanga. He cast his son Shanthanu Bhagyaraj as the child artist in Vaettiya Madichu Kattu in 1998 and the film dealt with the father-son relationship, this proved to be both a critical and financial disappointment capping an end to a string of continuous flops including Oru Oorla oru Rajakumari, Gnanapazham and Mr. Bechara (1996).

His successful Tamil films written by him continued to be in demand for Hindi remakes in the 1990s and were huge hits in Hindi – with Raasukutti remade as Raja Babu, Sundara Kandam remade as Andaz (1994) and Avasara Police 100 remade into Gopi Kishan, which were successful. He also wrote the script for the Tamil film Thaikulame Thaikulame (1995), starring Pandiarajan, whose actor-director was not himself in Hindi, remade as Gharwali Baharwali.

End of directions (2000–2010) 
He took a break from acting as the lead hero in Tamil films after the release of the massive critical and commercial failure Vaettiya Madichu Kattu. Instead, he directed the TV shows Neenga Nenaicha Saadhikkalanga and Idhu Oru Kadhayin Kadhai (for DD Podhigai), and appeared in Apapadi Podu on Jaya TV in this period. His tele-serial Rules Rangachari was very famous on DD channel and it completed 390 episodes. He wrote and directed the 2003 film Chokka Thangam, starring Vijayakanth. He launched his daughter Saranya Bhagyaraj with Parijatham, which he wrote and directed in 2006. He returned to acting with Something Something... Unakkum Enakkum and Rendu in a supporting role and with Kasu Irukkanum as the lead hero in 2007. In 2010, he directed his adult son Shanthanu Bhagyaraj in the romantic film Siddhu +2.

Later Years (2011–present) 
At the end of the 2010s, he acted in supporting roles such Appavi (2011) and  Vaagai Sooda Vaa (2011). He ventured into Malayalam film as supporting actor with Mr. Marumakan (2012).

He was the leading judge for the show Junior Super Star (2016) and Junior Super Stars (season 2) (2017).

He wrote books such as Vaanga Cinemavai Pattri Pesalam, Neenga Nenaicha Saadikkalaam and Ungal Bhagyaraj in Kelvi Bhadhil (Five Parts).

He appeared in action thriller films which went on to become commercial hits with Kanithan (2016) and  Thupparivaalan (2017).

In 2020, he later acted in the legal drama film Ponmagal Vandhal. Bhagyaraj plays as grandfather with Shanthanu in the  adult comedy film Murungakkai Chips. Bhagyaraj starrer in  Super Senior Heroes (2022) hints at redefining Superhero genre.

Politics 
MGR Makkal Munnetra Kazhagam (MGR Popular Progressive Federation) was a political party in the Indian state of Tamil Nadu launched by Bhagyaraj in February 1989. MGR MMK contested the 1991 Kerala assembly elections. It had one candidate, who got 87 votes. The MGR MMK party failed in its initial stages. Bhagyaraj later joined All India Anna Dravida Munnetra Kazhagam.

On April 5, 2006, Bhagyaraj joined the DMK in the presence of party president M Karunanidhi, and he criticised AIADMK general secretary J Jayalalithaa. Later, he left DMK and remained as a spectator in politics.

Controversy 
While speaking to the media at a press event for the film Karuthukalai Pathivu Sei in 2019, Bhagyaraj remarked that women invite males to sexually assault them and provide them the room to do so. He went on to ask, why males are usually blamed for crimes while women encourage them, apparently in relation with the Pollachi rape case. His misogynistic remarks drew widespread condemnation and opposition from the public, and several women's organisations demanded that he be prosecuted for them. The Tamil Nadu Commission for Women has summoned him to appear before it.

Filmography

Films

Singer

Television
Serials

Shows

References

External links 
 
 India Today – K. Bhagyaraj; The reigning king in the world of Madras film Hollywood

Tamil film directors
Tamil screenwriters
20th-century Indian male actors
1953 births
Living people
Filmfare Awards South winners
Tamil Nadu State Film Awards winners
20th-century Indian film directors
21st-century Indian film directors
People from Gobichettipalayam
21st-century Indian male actors
Tamil male actors
Screenwriters from Tamil Nadu
People from Erode district
South Indian International Movie Awards winners
Tamil television writers